Laird Township can refer to:

Laird Township, Ontario
Laird Township, Michigan
Laird Township, Phelps County, Nebraska